Balle à la main is a traditional Picard sport. It is a team sport with two teams of seven players on a called field "ballodrome". It is a game of gain-ground' as Longue paume, which takes place in Picardy.  Balle à la main is played on a rectangular field of 65 meters by 12 meters. As all the ballodromes of the games of gain-ground, the field has a line of fire and a rope.

Rules 
The ball is made with a lead pit, surrounded with wool and covered with leather. The diameter is about 4,2 cm with a weight about 43 g.

The game takes place according to the rules of the games of gagne-terrain (gain-ground) with in particular the use of the "chasses".  We play bare handed. Points for a set count by "fifteen" (15, 30, 45 and set), with possible advantage in the tie-break. A match takes place in 7 sets.

Sources 
  Lazure, Marcel, Les jeux de balle et ballon picards: ballon au poing, balle à la main, balle au tamis, longue paume, Centre régional de documentation pédagogique de Picardie, Amiens, France, 1996.

External links 
  Fédération Française de Balle à la Main
  Inventaire du Patrimoine Culturel Immatériel des jeux traditionnels français

Games of gain-ground
Ball games
Team sports
Sports originating in France
Picardy